Carteolol is a non-selective beta blocker used to treat glaucoma.

It has been found to act as a serotonin 5-HT1A and 5-HT1B receptor antagonist in addition to being a beta blocker.

It was patented in 1972 and approved for medical use in 1980.

Brand names
Brand names include Cartrol, Ocupress, Teoptic, Arteolol, Arteoptic, Calte, Cartéabak, Carteol, Cartéol, Cartrol, Elebloc, Endak, Glauteolol, Mikelan, Poenglaucol, and Singlauc.

References

External links
 
 
 

5-HT1A antagonists
5-HT1B antagonists
N-tert-butyl-phenoxypropanolamines
Beta blockers
2-Quinolones
Ophthalmology drugs